King Khalid Air Base (Arabic: قاعدة الملك خالد الجوية) (KKAB) is an airbase of Royal Saudi Air Force (RSAF) sited in the south-west of Saudi Arabia, near Khamis Mushait.

History

The airbase, with code KMX, has a  paved runway without customs facilities. The base was designed and built by the Dutch company Ballast Nedam for BAE in the 1960s, 1970s, and 1980s, and has McDonnell Douglas F-15 Eagle service facilities.

Gulf war

During the Gulf War in 1991, the USAF had a base here from which they launched F-117 stealth fighter from the 37th Tactical Fighter Wing on Baghdad, and other high priority targets in Iraq. On the opening night of the war Vickers VC10 tankers from No. 101 Squadron RAF launched here refueled Royal Air Force Panavia Tornado GR1s.

The RSAF forces included the newly formed 66th Squadron with Tornado GR1 aircraft and immediately post Gulf war 1 they took delivery of the RSAF GR1a Reconnaissance versions supported by the 66th Squadron Reconnaissance Intelligence Centre (RIC).

Later in the 1990s a second Tornado GR1 Squadron formed -  83rd Squadron.

Current use
 RSAF Wing 5: 
No. 6 Squadron RSAF with McDonnell Douglas F-15SA Strike Eagles
No. 55 Squadron RSAF with F-15SA Strike Eagles
No. 99 Squadron RSAF with the Eurocopter AS532M Cougar
No. 14  Squadron RSAF Detachment with the Bell 412EP

See also
 List of things named after Saudi Kings

References

1960 establishments in Saudi Arabia
Royal Saudi Air Force
Military installations of Saudi Arabia